Gussow is a surname. Notable people with the surname include:

Adam Gussow (born 1958), American musician and writer
Alan Gussow (1931–1997), American artist and professor
Joan Dye Gussow (born 1928), American academic and writer
Karl Gussow (1843–1907), German artist and professor
Margarete Gussow (born 1896), German astronomer
Mel Gussow (1933–2005), American theater and movie critic
Roy Gussow (1918–2011), American artist

See also
Gus Sow (born 1995), English professional footballer